Devesel is a commune located in Mehedinți County, Oltenia, Romania. It is composed of six villages: Batoți, Bistrețu, Devesel, Dunărea Mică, Scăpău and Tismana.

References

Communes in Mehedinți County
Localities in Oltenia